Diadegma aculeatum is a wasp first described by Bridgman in 1889. It inhabits Sweden. No subspecies are listed.

References

aculeatum
Insects described in 1889